Liminal is an English adjective meaning "on the threshold", from Latin līmen, plural limina.

Liminal or Liminality may refer to:

Anthropology and religion
 Liminality, the quality of ambiguity or disorientation that occurs in the middle stage of a rite of passage
 Liminal deity, a god or goddess in mythology who presides over thresholds, gates, or doorways
 Liminal being, mythical being of ambiguous existence
 Liminal state, English translation of bardo in Tibetan Buddhism

Arts and media
 Liminal States, a 2012 novel by Zack Parsons
 .hack//Liminality, an animated series related to the .hack video game series
 Liminal, a student literary journal at University of Minnesota, United States
 Liminal, a 2017 remix album by Sigur Rós
 Liminal, a 2022 album by Petbrick

Psychology
 Limen, a threshold of a physiological or psychological response
 Liminal experiences, feelings of abandonment (existentialism) associated with death, illness, disaster, etc.

See also
 Limen (disambiguation)
 Limerence, a stage or state of mind in a relationship
 Limina, a comune in the Messina, Sicily, Italy